D.Pydipala is a village in Rowthulapudi Mandal, Kakinada district in the state of Andhra Pradesh in India.

Geography 

Demographics 
 India census, D.Pydipala had a population of 201, out of which 100 were male and 101 were female. The population of children below 6 years of age was 15. The literacy rate of the village was 37.63%.

References 

Villages in Rowthulapudi mandal